1940 Emperor's Cup Final was the 20th final of the Emperor's Cup competition. The final was played at Meiji Jingu Gaien Stadium in Tokyo on May 26, 1940. Keio BRB won the championship.

Overview
Keio BRB won the championship, by defeating Waseda WMW 1–0. Keio BRB won the title for 2 years in a row. Keio BRB was featured a squad consisting of Yukio Tsuda, Hirokazu Ninomiya, Saburo Shinosaki and Takashi Kasahara. Waseda WMW was featured a squad consisting of Kunitaka Sueoka, Taizo Kawamoto, Motoo Tatsuhara, Hidetoki Takahashi and Takashi Kano.

Match details

See also
1940 Emperor's Cup

References

Emperor's Cup
1940 in Japanese football